In plumbing, a closet flange (also known as a toilet flange) is a pipe fitting (specifically, a type of flange) that both mounts a toilet to the floor and connects the closet bend to a drain pipe. The name comes from the term "water closet", the traditional name for a toilet.  A typical closet flange is made of brass, cast iron, ABS, PVC, and lead. 
In a typical installation, the closet flange is mounted on top of the floor with the hub fused around the drain pipe.  A wax ring (or waxless) is used to seal the gap between the flange and the bottom of the toilet. The toilet is bolted to the flange, not to the floor.

Toilet components